A bus lane or bus-only lane is a lane restricted to buses, often on certain days and times, and generally used to speed up public transport that would be otherwise held up by traffic congestion. The related term busway describes a roadway completely dedicated for use by buses. Bus lanes are a key component of a high-quality bus rapid transit (BRT) network, improving bus travel speeds and reliability by reducing delay caused by other traffic.

A dedicated bus lane may occupy only part of a roadway which also has lanes serving general automotive traffic; in contrast to a transit mall which is a pedestrianized roadway also served by transit.

History
The first bus lane is often erroneously attributed to Chicago, where in 1939 Sheridan Road was installed with reversible lanes north of Foster Avenue. The setup consisted of three-lanes towards the peak direction (south in the morning; north in the evening), and one contraflow lane. None of the lanes exclusively carried buses, but were designed to facilitate bus operations. In 1948, the East Side Trolley Tunnel in Providence, Rhode Island was converted to bus-only use and became the first dedicated busway in the United States, continuing to operate to this day. In 1956 Nashville became the first city to implement on-street bus lanes. Later that year, Chicago implemented a bus lane in the center of Washington Street, a five lane one-way street downtown.

The first bus lanes in Europe were established in 1963 in the German city of Hamburg, when the tram system was closed and the former dedicated tram tracks were converted for bus travel. Other large German cities soon followed, and the implementation of bus lanes was officially sanctioned in the German highway code in 1970. Many experts from other countries (Japan among the first) studied the German example and implemented similar solutions. On 15 January 1964 the first bus lane in France was designated along the quai du Louvre in Paris and the first contraflow lane was established on the old pont de l’Alma on 15 June 1966.

On 26 February 1968 the first bus lane in London was put into service on Vauxhall Bridge. The first contraflow bus lane in the UK was introduced in King's Road, Reading as a temporary measure when the road was made one-way (eastwards to Cemetery Junction) on 16 June 1968. The initial reason was to save the expense of rerouting the trolleybus, which was due to be scrapped on 3 November of that year. However the experiment proved so successful that it was made permanent for use by motor buses. In October 1971 Runcorn opened the world's first bus rapid transitway.

The El Monte Busway between El Monte and Downtown Los Angeles was the first dedicated busway in the US, constructed in 1974.

Design
Bus lanes may be located in different locations on a street, such as on the sides of a street near the curb, or down the center. They may be long, continuous networks, or short segments used to allow buses to bypass bottlenecks or reduce route complexity, such as in a contraflow bus lane.

Bus lanes may be demarcated in several ways. Descriptive text such as "BUS LANE" may be marked prominently on the road surface, particularly at the beginning and end. Some cities use a diamond-shaped pavement marking to indicate an exclusive bus lane. The road surface may have a distinctive color, usually red, which has been shown to reduce prohibited vehicles from entering bus lanes. Road signs may communicate when a bus lane is in effect.

Bus lanes may also be physically separated from other traffic using bollards, curbs, or other raised elements.

In some cities, such as The Hague in the Netherlands, buses are allowed to use reserved tram tracks, usually laid in the middle of the road and marked with the text "Lijnbus".

Bus gates

In the United Kingdom bus gates are common in towns and cities. A bus gate consists of a short section of road that only buses and authorised vehicles (typically taxis) can pass through. They are normally marked with the same street signage as bus lanes, but have "BUS GATE" marked on the road surface. Bus gates are normally used as "short cuts" for public transport at junctions, roundabouts or through one-way systems.

Operation 
Bus lanes may have separate sets of dedicated traffic signals, to allow transit signal priority at intersections.

Peak-only bus lanes are enforced only at certain times of the day, usually during rush hour, reverting to a general purpose or parking lane at other times. Peak-only bus lanes may be in effect only in the main direction of travel, such as towards a downtown during morning rush hour traffic, with the buses using general purpose lanes in the other direction.

Entire streets can be designated as bus lanes (such as Oxford Street in London, Princes Street in Edinburgh, or Fulton Street in Downtown Brooklyn), allowing buses, taxis and delivery vehicles only, or a contra-flow bus lane can allow buses to travel in the opposite direction to other vehicles.

Some locations allow bicyclists or taxis to use bus lanes, however where bus or bicycle volumes are high, mixed traffic operations may result in uncomfortable conditions or delays. Certain other vehicles may also be permitted in bus lanes, such as taxis, high occupancy vehicles, motorcycles, or bicycles. Police, ambulance services and fire brigades can also use these lanes.

In the Netherlands mixed bus/cycle lanes are uncommon. According to the Sustainable Safety guidelines they would violate the principle of homogeneity and put road users of very different masses and speed behaviour into the same lane, which is generally discouraged.

Enforcement
Bus lanes can become ineffective if weak enforcement allows use by unauthorized vehicles or illegal parking. Center-running bus lanes avoid the problem of private vehicles blocking the lane by double parking for loading of passengers or cargo.

Evidence from the operation of urban arterials in Brisbane shows that a properly enforced bus lane, operating as designed without interference, can increase passenger throughput. In 2009 and 2010 traffic surveys showed that in Brisbane on a number of urban arterials with Bus and Transit lanes, non-compliance rates were approaching 90%. Following enhanced enforcement of the lanes, non-compliance rates dropped and overall efficiency of the Bus and Transit lanes improved with an up to 12% increase in total passenger throughput in the lane. Average bus journey times dropped, in some cases, by up to 19%.

Some cities, including San Francisco and New York, employ automated camera enforcement, using either stationary cameras adjacent to the bus lane, or cameras on the front of buses to automatically issue citations to vehicles obstructing the bus lane.

Effectiveness
Bus lanes give priority to buses, cutting down on journey times where roads are congested with other traffic and increasing the reliability of buses. The introduction of bus lanes can significantly assist in the reduction of air pollution.

Bus lanes marked with colored pavement have been shown to reduce intrusions into bus lanes, speeding travel time and increasing bus reliability.

Major networks
Some network lengths of bus lanes in major cities, listed by buses per km of bus lane):

The busiest bus lane in the United States is the Lincoln Tunnel XBL (exclusive bus lane) along the Lincoln Tunnel Approach and Helix in Hudson County, New Jersey, which carries approximately 700 buses per hour during morning peak times an average of one bus every 5.1 seconds. In contrast, the Cross-Harbour Tunnel in Hong Kong carries 14,500 buses per day, or an average of about 605 an hour all day (not just peak times), but the bus lane must give way to all the other road users resulting in long queues of buses.

CityTransit Data is a website procured by the UITP that contains statistics about, among other things, the "length of dedicated PT [public transport] operational infrastructure" for each mode. Its definition states: "The indicator reflects the length of the exclusive sections along which regular private car traffic is not allowed to use the same space travelling in the same direction".  In other words, for the bus mode, it represents the summed length of bus lanes operational in a certain region. In 2020, there were 438.4 km of bus operational infrastructure per million inhabitant for the metropolitain region of Montréal.

Criticism
The installation of bus lanes requires additional space to either be constructed (increasing the impact of the road on the surrounding area, and possibly requiring taking of private land), or space must be taken from existing lanes, reducing that available for vehicles.

Some jurisdictions have allowed access to bus lanes to electric cars and/or hybrid cars. Oslo removed this exception in 2017 following protests due to congestion in bus lanes. The large number of electric vehicles on Norwegian roads slowed buses, defeating the purpose of bus lanes. A similar experiment is being done in Bengaluru, India. However, it is facing teething issues. Citizens raised several concerns about traffic congestion, lack of awareness among drivers and road users, lack of streetlighting, bus breakdowns in the bus lane causing bottlenecks, absence of lane discipline, and narrow roads, among other things.

Gallery

See also

 Bus rapid transit (BRT)
 Bus priority
 Guided bus
 High-occupancy vehicle lane (HOV lane)
 Public transport bus service
 Reversible lane
 Straddling bus

References

External links
Transit lane design guidance from the National Association of City Transportation Officials Transit Street Design Guide.

Road traffic management
Bus terminology
Transportation planning
Sustainable transport